A Cossack host (kazachye voysko), sometimes translated as Cossack army, was an administrative subdivision of Cossacks in the Russian Empire. Earlier the term viisko (host) referred to Cossack organizations in their historical territories, most notable being the Zaporozhian Host of Ukrainian Cossacks.

Russian Empire 
Each Cossack host consisted of a certain territory with Cossack settlements that had to provide military regiments for service in the Imperial Russian Army and for  border patrol. Usually the hosts were named after the regions of their location. The stanitsa, or village, formed the primary unit of this organization.

In the Russian Empire (1721-1917), the Cossacks constituted eleven separate hosts, settled along the frontiers: 

 the Don Cossack Host
 the Kuban Cossack Host
 the Terek Cossack Host
 the Astrakhan Cossack Host
 the Ural Cossack Host
 the Orenburg Cossack Host
 Siberian Cossacks
 the Semiryechye Cossack Host
 the Transbaikal Cossack Host
 the Amur Cossack Host
 the Ussuri Cossack Host 

There was also a small number of the Cossacks in Krasnoyarsk and Irkutsk, who would form the Yenisey Cossack Host and the Irkutsk Cossack Regiment of the Ministry of the Interior in 1917.

Cossack hosts on Russian soil were disbanded in 1920, in the course of the Russian Civil War of 1917-1922 in a deliberate process of De-Cossackization to remove their identity. Cossacks who settled abroad continued to preserve the traditions of their hosts of origin (for example: the Triunited Don-Kuban-Terek Cossack Union founded in Istanbul in January 1921).

List of hosts
 Amur Cossack Host (1854–)
 Astrakhan Cossack Host
 Azov Cossack Host (1832–1862)
 Baikal Cossack Host (1655-1920)
  (1798-1865)
 Black Sea Cossack Host (1787–1864)
 Buh Cossack Host (1769–1817)
 Caucasus Line Cossack Host (1832–1860)
 Danube Cossack Host (1828–1868), an Imperial Russian Cossack Host formed from descendants of the Zaporozhian Cossacks
 Don Cossack Host (1570-)
 Greben Cossacks Host (1711-)
 Kuban Cossack Host (1860–1920)
 Orenburg Cossack Host (1755–1920)
 Semiryechye Cossack Host (1867–1920)
 Siberian Cossack Host (1582-1918)
 Terek Cossack Host (1577–)
 Transbaikal Cossack Host (1851–1920)
 Ural Cossack Host
 Ussuri Cossack Host (1889–1922)
 Volga Cossack Host (1734–1777)
 Zaporozhian Host (–1775) — the Ukrainian Cossacks who lived in Zaporizhia, in Central Ukraine during the 16th — 18th centuries.

See also 
 Danubian Sich
 Sloboda Ukraine
 Military settlement

References 

 Cossack host